Theodor Anton Blank (19 September 1905 – 14 May 1972) was a German politician of the CDU. He was one of the founders of the CDU in 1945.

Blank was born in Elz an der Lahn. He was the third of ten children of a carpenter. His family was Roman Catholic. Blank received an apprenticeship as a carpenter. In 1930–33 he worked as a secretary at the Association of Christian transport- and factory employees of the northern and northwestern Ruhr Area. After he was dismissed in 1933 Blank passed his Abitur in 1936 and studied mathematics at the University of Münster and engineering sciences at Leibniz University Hannover. In 1939 he was conscripted to the Wehrmacht and became a first lieutenant at the end of World War II.

From 1949 to 1972 he was a member of the German Bundestag, in which he served from 1965 to 1969 as deputy chief of CDU/CSU-Bundestagsfraktion.

From 1950 to 1955 he served as Special Representative of the Chancellor, leading the "Amt Blank" (Blank Agency), officially responsible for affairs relating to the Allied occupying troops, but in reality mainly charged by Chancellor Konrad Adenauer with covertly preparing the re-establishment of the German armed forces. In 1954, opponents of the rearmament prevented him from speaking to public assemblies by yelling and shouting, and lightly wounded him in one instance. After the rearmament was official, he served as the first postwar Defence Minister of Germany from 1955 to 1956 and as Minister of Labour and Social Affairs from 1957 to 1965.

Blank died in Bonn.

References 

1905 births
1972 deaths
Defence ministers of Germany
Labor ministers (Germany)
Social Affairs ministers of Germany
Members of the Bundestag for North Rhine-Westphalia
Members of the Bundestag 1969–1972
Members of the Bundestag 1965–1969
Members of the Bundestag 1961–1965
Members of the Bundestag 1957–1961
Members of the Bundestag 1953–1957
Members of the Bundestag 1949–1953
People from Hesse-Nassau
German military personnel of World War II
University of Münster alumni
University of Hanover alumni
Grand Crosses 1st class of the Order of Merit of the Federal Republic of Germany
Members of the Bundestag for the Christian Democratic Union of Germany